The 2011 WOW Tennis Challenger was a professional tennis tournament played on outdoor clay courts. It was the 4th edition of the tournament and part of the 2011 ITF Women's Circuit, offering a total of $50,000 in prize money. It took place in Waterloo, Ontario, Canada between July 4 and July 10, 2011.

Singles main draw entrants

Seeds

1 Rankings are as of June 20, 2011

Other entrants
The following players received wildcards into the singles main draw:
 Élisabeth Abanda
 Sonja Molnar
 Kimberley-Ann Surin
 Carol Zhao

The following players received entry from the qualifying draw:
 Victoryia Kisialeva
 Elizabeth Lumpkin
 Diana Ospina
 Nicola Slater

Champions

Singles

 Sharon Fichman def.  Julia Boserup, 6–3, 4–6, 6–4

Doubles

 Alexandra Mueller /  Asia Muhammad def.  Eugenie Bouchard /  Megan Moulton-Levy, 6–3, 3–6, [10–7]

References
Official website

WOW Tennis Challenger
Waterloo Challenger
WOW Tennis Challenger
WOW Tennis Challenger